1967 may also refer to:

 The year 1967
 1967, the natural number following 1966 and preceding 1968
 "1967" (song), a song by Tom Robinson
 1967 (album), a compilation album